Gilbertown is a town in Choctaw County, Alabama, United States. At the 2020 census, the population was 739.

Geography
Gilbertown is located in southern Choctaw County at 31°52'36.034" North, 88°19'15.265" West (31.876676, -88.320907).

Demographics

As of the census of 2000, there were 187 people, 90 households, and 54 families residing in the town. The racial makeup of the town was 86.63% White, 10.70% Black or African American, 1.07% Native American, and 1.60% from two or more races.

There were 90 households, out of which 24.4% had children under the age of 18 living with them, 48.9% were married couples living together, 7.8% had a female householder with no husband present, and 38.9% were non-families. 35.6% of all households were made up of individuals, and 21.1% had someone living alone who was 65 years of age or older. The average household size was 2.08 and the average family size was 2.69.

In the town, the population was spread out, with 18.7% under the age of 18, 5.9% from 18 to 24, 26.7% from 25 to 44, 30.5% from 45 to 64, and 18.2% who were 65 years of age or older. The median age was 43 years. For every 100 females, there were 83.3 males. For every 100 females age 18 and over, there were 85.4 males.

The median income for a household in the town was $27,917, and the median income for a family was $44,167. Males had a median income of $40,625 versus $21,250 for females. The per capita income for the town was $18,492. About 15.5% of families and 23.1% of the population were below the poverty line, including 38.6% of those under the age of eighteen and 19.4% of those 65 or over.

Local events include the Choctaw County Heritage Festival, which takes place usually between May 30 and June 3. Gilbertown is the site of the first producing oil well in Alabama.

First permitted oil well in Alabama 
The first permit to drill an oil well in Alabama, the A. R. Jackson Well No. 1, was granted to the Hunt Oil Company on January 2, 1944, near Gilbertown.

Climate
The climate in this area is characterized by hot, humid summers and generally mild to cool winters. According to the Köppen Climate Classification system, Gilbertown has a humid subtropical climate, abbreviated "Cfa" on climate maps.

Notable people
Angela Quentina Arnold (known as AQA), professional wrestler signed to AEW.
Gary Banks, 2000 graduate of Southern Choctaw High School; former right fielder for Chicago Cubs minor league; former wide receiver for San Diego Chargers
Jeff Branson, former infielder for Cincinnati Reds, Cleveland Indians, and Los Angeles Dodgers; and former hitting coach for Pittsburgh Pirates.
Spencer Johnson, former defensive tackle for Minnesota Vikings and Buffalo Bills
Paul Ruffin, first African American to be promoted to Senior Research Scientist within the civilian U.S. Army workforce

References

External links
Gilbertown, AL profile at Choctaw County Public Library Broken Link
Coastal Gateway Regional Economic Development Alliance

Towns in Alabama
Towns in Choctaw County, Alabama